The Council elections held in Wolverhampton on Thursday 5 May 1994 were one third, and 20 of the 60 seats were up for election.

During the 1994 election the Labour Party gained Bushbury and Park wards from the Conservative Party, leaving Labour with overall control of the Council.

Due to a vacancy arising shortly before the election was called Heath Town ward elected two members in 1994.

Prior to the election the constitution of the Council was:

Conservative 28
Labour 29
Lib Dem 3

Following the election the constitution of the Council was:

Labour 31
Conservative 26
Lib Dem 3

Election result

1994
1994 English local elections
1990s in the West Midlands (county)